Bourletiella rustica is a species of globular springtails in the family Bourletiellidae.

References

Collembola
Articles created by Qbugbot
Animals described in 1951